Nancy Jane Marie Heathcote-Drummond-Willoughby, 28th Baroness Willoughby de Eresby (born 1 December 1934), is an English peer and member of the Astor family. She is a  holder of the office of Lord Great Chamberlain, which is exercised by the 7th Baron Carrington.

Family
She is the daughter of James Heathcote-Drummond-Willoughby, 3rd Earl of Ancaster, and Nancy Phyllis Louise Astor (daughter of Waldorf Astor, 2nd Viscount Astor). Her brother Timothy Gilbert (born 19 March 1936), heir apparent of the Earldom of Ancaster, was lost at sea in 1963.

Adult life
Lady Willoughby was one of the six Maids of Honour at the 1953 coronation of Queen Elizabeth II.

Her father was the third and last Earl of Ancaster. On his death in 1983, the earldom became extinct, but according to the rules of succession to the ancient peerage, she succeeded him as Baroness Willoughby de Eresby. She became the sixth woman to hold the barony, which is distinguished by its suffix from that of Willoughby de Broke. She also inherited  divided between Lincolnshire and Perthshire and in 2008 was ranked 1,572nd in a list of richest people forming the annual report of the Sunday Times, citing her wealth as £48 million. The annual report includes domiciled and non-domiciled visitors believed to be in the United Kingdom at the start of each year. Her father left net assets subjected to tax to his heirs on his death attested as £1,486,694 (equivalent to £5 million in 2019), but may have transferred assets before his death. 

In 1987, Lady Willoughby became a patron of King Edward VI School in Spilsby (now King Edward VI Academy). She also served as a Deputy Lieutenant of Lincolnshire.

Like most other hereditary peers, Lady Willoughby lost her seat in the House of Lords as a result of the House of Lords Act 1999. She has not been elected as one of the ninety hereditary peers to hold a seat for life. However, she has a quarter-share in the hereditary position of Lord Great Chamberlain, which carries with it a seat in the House of Lords, although the quarter share means only that she is a Joint Hereditary Lord Great Chamberlain, with the possibility of gaining the position in every fourth monarch's reign; her relevant family tree back to 1789 features in this regard, as the office was split by decision of the House of Lords between the daughters of Robert Bertie, 4th Duke of Ancaster and Kesteven (who was also Lord Willoughby de Eresby and Marquess of Lindsey).

Heirs
Lady Willoughby de Eresby is unmarried and without issue. The co-heirs presumptive to the peerage are Sebastian St Maur Miller (born 1965), grandson of her older aunt, and Sir John Aird, 4th Baronet (born 1940), son of her younger aunt. They will also share equally in Lady Willoughby de Eresby's quarter-interest in the office of Lord Great Chamberlain, giving them one eighth of the role each, behind that of the Marquess of Cholmondeley, who takes the role in every second reign. The Marquess will have the next turn to nominate a Lord Great Chamberlain. After that, the Willoughby de Eresby share in the office will take its turn.

See also
 Drummond Castle
 Grimsthorpe Castle

References

Bibliography
 

28
Hereditary women peers
British maids of honour
1934 births
Astor family
Heathcote family
Livingston family
Living people
Daughters of British earls
English people of German descent
English people of Irish descent
English people of Scottish descent
20th-century English people
20th-century English women
21st-century English people
21st-century English women

Willoughby de Eresby